Pasar tells the story about three friends who worked at the pasar malam together. Pasar is co-produced by ntv7 from Malaysia and mm2 Entertainment.

Chinese-language drama television series in Malaysia
2009 Malaysian television series debuts
2009 Malaysian television series endings
NTV7 original programming